Aingeville is a commune in the Vosges department in Grand Est in northeastern France. The village was built on the left bank of the river Anger, a tributary of the Mouzon and sub-tributary of the Meuse.

Population

See also
Communes of the Vosges department

References

Communes of Vosges (department)